Dharmavati is a rāgam in Carnatic music (musical scale of South Indian classical music). It is the 59th Melakarta rāgam in the 72 melakarta rāgam system of Carnatic music. It is called Dhaamavati in Muthuswami Dikshitar school of Carnatic music. Madhuvanti is the nearest Hindustani music scale to Dharmavati.
Raga Dharmavati was introduced in Hindustani music in vocal style for the first time by late Pandit Samaresh Chawdhury ( disciple of Pandit Ravi Shankar)

Structure and Lakshana

It is the 5th rāgam in the 10th chakra Disi. The mnemonic name is Disi-Ma. The mnemonic phrase is sa ri gi mi pa dhi nu. Its  structure (ascending and descending scale) is as follows (see swaras in Carnatic music for details on below notation and terms):
: 
: 
(the notes in this scale are chathusruthi rishabham, sadharana gandharam, prati madhyamam, chathusruthi dhaivatham, kakali nishadham)

As it is a melakarta rāgam, by definition it is a sampoorna rāgam (has all seven notes in ascending and descending scale). It is the prati madhyamam equivalent of Gourimanohari, which is the 23rd melakarta.

Janya rāgams 
Dharmavati has a few janya rāgams (derived scales) associated with it, of which Madhuvanti, Ranjani, Sri Tyagaraja and Vijayanagari are popular in concerts. See List of janya rāgams for all rāgams associated with Dharmavati.

Compositions 

Here are a few common compositions sung in concerts, set to Dharmavati.

Parandaamavati Jayathi by Muthuswami Dikshitar (includes the name of rāgam Dhaamavati in the lyrics)
Dharmave jayavemba by Purandara Dasa
Mullai Oorntha, ancient Tamil Kuruntokai poetry by Rajan Somasundaram from Sandham: Symphony Meets Classical Tamil
Ododi vandhen kanna by Ambujam Krishna
Bhajana Seyada Rada by Mysore Vasudevachar
Vashama Nee by M. Balamuralikrishna

Notable film composers like T.G.Lingappa, Ilaiyaraja and later A. R. Rahman have composed film songs based on the scale of Dharmavati. T.G.Lingappa composed song such as 'kanasalli bandavanyare' (Shruti seridaga). Ilaiyaraja composed songs such as 'Meendum Meedum Vaa' (Vikram), 'Andhela Ravamidhi', (Swarna Kamalam), 'Vaanaville' (Ramana), 'Nataraaja paadaalu' (Aalaapana) in this raaga while Rahman composed "Ottagathai Kattiko", in the 1993 Tamil film Gentleman, based on the Dharmavati scale.

Film Songs

Language:Tamil

Related rāgams
This section covers the theoretical and scientific aspect of this rāgam.

Dharmavati's notes when shifted using Graha bhedam, yields 2 other Melakarta rāgams, namely, Chakravakam and Sarasangi. Graha bhedam is the step taken in keeping the relative note frequencies same, while shifting the shadjam to the next note in the rāgam. For further details and an illustration refer Graha bhedam on Dharmavati.

See also

List of Film Songs based on Ragas

Notes

References

Melakarta ragas